Milevsko is a town in Písek District in the South Bohemian Region of the Czech Republic. It has about 8,000 inhabitants.

Administrative parts
Villages of Dmýštice, Klisín, Něžovice, Rukáveč and Velká are administrative parts of Milevsko. Velká forms an exclave of the municipal territory.

Geography
The town is surrounded by several ponds.

History

Archeological excavations have shown that the people lived in the area in the Paleolithic times. Other discoveries show occupation in the Bronze Age and the Hallstatt Culture period. During the Migration Period the area was slowly settled by Slavs in the 8th century.

The first written mention of Milevsko is from 1184 and three years later a Premonstratensian monastery was built. At the end of the 12th century, Milevsko was an important intersection of two trade routes. The following years were the time of prosperity and the monastery became one of the richest monasteries in the Bohemia. In 1327, Milevsko was first referred to as a market town, and in the 15th century, it became a town. The end of prosperity was caused by an attack of the Hussites, who burned the monastery down in 1420. After 1581 during the rule of Hodějovský of Hodějov, the monastery was rebuilt to a manor house. In 1622 after the Battle of White Mountain, the monastery was returned to Premonstrates of Strahov Monastery.

In the 17th and 18th centuries the town was struck by the bubonic plague. The town with its surroundings became one of the poorest regions in the kingdom, which lasted until the beginning of the 20th century. Traditional crafts developed here, especially pottery.

Until 1918, Mühlhausen bei Tabor – Milevsko (previously Mühlhausen) was a part of the lands of Austrian monarchy (Austria side after the compromise of 1867), The town was principal settlement in the eponymous district which was one of 94 Bezirkshauptmannschaften of Bohemia.

Demographics

Economy
In Milevsko is a big machine factory ZVVZ (Závody na výrobu vzduchotechnických zařízení – the factory for the production of HVAC equipment).

Sights

The monastery complex consisting of several buildings is the main landmark. The Milevsko Monastery is the oldest in the South Bohemian Region. The Romanesque core is preserved to this day. The western part was rebuilt to the Baroque style and today it houses the regional Milevsko Museum.

The Church of Saint Giles is as old as the town. The massive bell tower and the north wall with a staircase have been preserved from the original Romanesque church. The church was rebuilt in Gothic style in the 14th century.

The historic town centre is made up of Dr. E. Beneše Square. Its landmarks are Old Town Hall, New Town Hall, and a church. The Church of Saint Bartholomew is a Neo-Romanesque building from 1844. The Old Town Hall was built in the Baroque style in the 17th century and today serves as a library, tourist information centre, gallery, and bank. The New Town Hall is a Neo-Renaissance building from 1901–1902 with sgraffito decoration of the facade from 1936.

Twin towns – sister cities

Milevsko is twinned with:
 Münchenbuchsee, Switzerland

References

External links

Cities and towns in the Czech Republic
Populated places in Písek District